Vaudémont is a commune in the Meurthe-et-Moselle department in north-eastern France.

Sights and monuments
 Château de Vaudémont - ruined 11th-century castle protected as a monument historique by the French Ministry of Culture

See also
 Communes of the Meurthe-et-Moselle department

References

Communes of Meurthe-et-Moselle